In statistical physics and mathematics, percolation theory describes the behavior of a network when nodes or links are added. This is a geometric type of phase transition, since at a critical fraction of addition the network of small, disconnected clusters merge into significantly larger connected, so-called spanning clusters. The applications of percolation theory to materials science and in many other disciplines are discussed here and in the articles network theory and percolation.

Introduction

A representative question (and the source of the name) is as follows. Assume that some liquid is poured on top of some porous material. Will the liquid be able to make its way from hole to hole and reach the bottom? This physical question is modelled mathematically as a three-dimensional network of  vertices, usually called "sites", in which the edge or "bonds" between each two neighbors may be open (allowing the liquid through) with probability , or closed with probability , and they are assumed to be independent. Therefore, for a given , what is the probability that an open path (meaning a path, each of whose links is an "open" bond) exists from the top to the bottom? The behavior for large  is of primary interest.

In a slightly different mathematical model for obtaining a random graph, a site is "occupied" with probability  or "empty" (in which case its edges are removed) with probability ; the corresponding problem is called site percolation. The question is the same: for a given p, what is the probability that a path exists between top and bottom? Similarly, one can ask, given a connected graph at what fraction  of failures the graph will become disconnected (no large component).

The same questions can be asked for any lattice dimension. As is quite typical, it is actually easier to examine infinite networks than just large ones. In this case the corresponding question is: does an infinite open cluster exist? That is, is there a path of connected points of infinite length "through" the network? By Kolmogorov's zero–one law, for any given , the probability that an infinite cluster exists is either zero or one. In practice, this criticality is very easy to observe.

History 
The Flory–Stockmayer theory was the first theory investigating percolation processes.

The history of the percolation model as we know it has its root in the coal industry. Since the industrial revolution, the economical importance of this source of energy fostered many scientific studies to understand its composition and optimize its use. During the 30' and 40', the qualitative analysis by organic chemistry left more and more room to more quantitative studies. 

In this context, the British Coal Utilisation Research Association (BCURA) was created in 1938. It is a research association funded by the coal mines owners. In 1942, Rosalind Franklin, who then recently graduated in chemistry from the university of Cambridge, joined the BCURA. She started research on the density and porosity of coal. During the Second World War, coal was an important strategic resource. It was used as a source of energy, but also was the main constituent of gas masks.

Coal is a porous medium. To measure its 'real' density, one was to sink it in a liquid or a gas whose molecule are small enough to fill its microscopic pores. While trying to measure the density of coal using several gases (helium, methanol, hexane, benzene) and as she found different values depending on the used gas, Rosalind Franklin showed that the pores of coal are made of microstructures of various lengths that act as a microscopic sieve to discriminate the gases. She also discovered that the size of these structures depends on the temperature of carbonation during the coal production. With these research, she obtained a PhD degree and she left the BCURA in 1946.

In the mid fifties, Simon Broadbent worked in the BCURA as a statistician. Among other interests, he studied the use of coal in gas masks. One question is to understand how a fluid can diffuse in the coal pores, modeled as a random maze of open or closed tunnels. In 1954, during a symposium on Monte Carlo methods, he asks questions to John Hammersley on the use of numerical methods to analyze this model.

Broadbent and Hammersley introduced in their article of 1957 a mathematical model to model this phenomenon, that is percolation.

Computation of the critical parameter 

For most infinite lattice graphs,  cannot be calculated exactly, though in some cases  there is an exact value. For example:

for the square lattice  in two dimensions,  for bond percolation, a fact which was an open question for more than 20 years and was finally resolved by Harry Kesten in the early 1980s, see .

So, for random Erdős–Rényi networks of average degree , .
 In networks with low clustering, the critical point gets scaled by  such that:

  

This indicates that for a given degree distribution, the clustering leads to a larger percolation threshold, mainly because for a fixed number of links, the clustering structure reinforces the core of the network with the price of diluting the global connections. For networks with high clustering, strong clustering could induce the core–periphery structure, in which the core and periphery might percolate at different critical points, and the above approximate treatment is not applicable.

Universality
For example the distribution of the size of clusters at criticality decays as a power law with the same exponent for all 2d lattices. However, recently percolation has been performed on a weighted planar stochastic lattice (WPSL) and found that although the dimension of the WPSL coincides with the dimension of the space where it is embedded, its universality class is different from that of all the known planar lattices.

Phases

Subcritical and supercritical

The main fact in the subcritical phase is "exponential decay". That is, when , the probability that a specific point (for example, the origin) is contained in an open cluster (meaning a maximal connected set of "open" edges of the graph) of size  decays to zero exponentially in . In two dimensions, it formed part of Kesten's proof that .

The dual graph of the square lattice  is also the square lattice. It follows that, in two dimensions, the supercritical phase is dual to a subcritical percolation process. The main result for the supercritical phase in three and more dimensions is that,  for sufficiently large , there is an infinite open cluster in the two-dimensional slab .

Thus the subcritical phase may be described as finite open islands in an infinite closed ocean. When  just the opposite occurs, with finite closed islands in an infinite open ocean.

Criticality

Scaling theory predicts the existence of critical exponents, depending on the number d of dimensions, that determine the class of the singularity. When  these predictions are backed up by arguments from conformal field theory and Schramm–Loewner evolution, and include predicted numerical values for the exponents. They include:

 There are no infinite clusters (open or closed)
  does not depend on the particular lattice chosen, or on other local parameters. It depends only on the dimension  (this is an instance of the universality principle).
  decreases from  until  and then stays fixed.
 
 .
 The shape of a large cluster in two dimensions is conformally invariant.

See . In 11 or more dimensions, these facts are largely proved using a technique known as the lace expansion. It is believed that a version of the lace expansion should be valid for 7 or more dimensions, perhaps with implications also for the threshold case of 6 dimensions.

In two dimensions, the first fact ("no percolation in the critical phase") is proved for many lattices, using duality. Substantial progress has been made on two-dimensional percolation through the conjecture of Oded Schramm that the scaling limit of a large cluster may be described in terms of a Schramm–Loewner evolution.

Different models
The first model studied was Bernoulli percolation. In this model all bonds are independent.  This model is called bond percolation by physicists.
A generalization was next introduced as the Fortuin–Kasteleyn random cluster model, which has many connections with the Ising model and other Potts models.
Bernoulli (bond) percolation on complete graphs is an example of a random graph.  The critical probability is , where  is the number of vertices (sites) of the graph.
Bootstrap percolation removes active cells from clusters when they have too few active neighbors, and looks at the connectivity of the remaining cells.
First passage percolation.
Invasion percolation.

Applications

In biology, biochemistry, and physical virology 
Percolation theory has been used to successfully predict the fragmentation of biological virus shells (capsids), with the fragmentation threshold of Hepatitis B virus capsid predicted and detected experimentally. When a critical number of subunits has been randomly removed from the nanoscopic shell, it fragments and this fragmentation may be detected using Charge Detection Mass Spectroscopy (CDMS) among other single-particle techniques.  This is a molecular analog to the common board game Jenga, and has relevance to the broader study of virus disassembly.  Interestingly, more stable viral particles (tilings with greater fragmentation thresholds) are found in greater abundance in nature.

In ecology 
Percolation theory has been applied to studies of how environment fragmentation impacts animal habitats and models of how the plague bacterium Yersinia pestis spreads.

See also

References

Further reading

External links
PercoVIS: a  program to visualize percolation on networks in real time
Interactive Percolation
Nanohub online course on Percolation Theory